The Gungarlin River, a perennial river of the Snowy River catchment, is located in the Snowy Mountains region of New South Wales, Australia.

Course and features
The Gungarlin River rises below the Munyang Range, in the southern part of the Kosciuszko National Park, on the slopes of Happy Jacks Plain. The river flows generally south southeast, then south by west, then west by south, and finally south by west, joined by two tributaries including the Burrungubugge River, before reaching its confluence with the Snowy River. The river descends  over its  course.

The Snowy Mountains Scheme captures water from the lower Gungarlin River at the Gungarlin Weir and diverts water to the Island Bend Reservoir.  The Snowy Water Inquiry Outcomes Implementation Deed identifies environmental water allocations to the released from the Gungarlin Weir as part of the Snowy Montane Rivers Increased Flows.  The reaches below the weir currently contain no base flow.

Recreation
There are many mountain huts along or close to the river including Daveys Hut, Botherum Plain Hut, Buhlmans, Mrs Caseys, and Kellys Hut.

The Gungarlin River is a popular summer destination for trout fishing, cycling and hiking.

See also

 List of rivers of New South Wales (A-K)
 List of rivers of Australia
 Rivers of New South Wales
 Snowy Mountains Scheme

References

External links
Snowy Flow Response Monitoring and Modelling

 

Rivers of New South Wales
Snowy Mountains Scheme